Provo High School is a public secondary school located in Provo, Utah, United States. It is one of three high schools in the Provo City School District and was the oldest secondary school in the city. In the Summer of 2017 the school district began building a new school. The school was finished in August 2018.

History
Provo High School was founded in 1912. It did not graduate its first students until 1921. The students originally met at Provo Center School before a specific high school building was built in 1920. The current Provo High School was built in 2018.

Move
In December 2015, the Provo City School District voted to sell the 25 acre property where Provo High School stands and move to a location in the western side of the city, rather than rebuild on the current site. It was later revealed that nearby Brigham Young University was purchasing the land for $25 million. The new high school site is located on a 42-acre plot at 1199 N. Lakeshore Drive. The layout includes three stories, three classroom wings, and three gymnasiums. It opened to the public in August 2018.

Clubs and organizations

 Barbecue Boys
 Polynesian Club 
 Capoeira Club
 National Honor Society
 Cheerleading
 Youth Crime Watch
 Mandarin Chinese
 Student Government
 FBLA
 FCCLA
 FFA
 Thespian Club
 GSA
 Anime Club
 Provo Football
 Ski Club
 Cross Country
 Track and Field
 Technology Student Association
 Science Club
 Computer Club
 Literature
 Todd Squad
 PHS Band
 PHS Peace And Justice Club
 Speech and Debate
 SkillsUSA
 Dance Company
 Ballroom Dance (Varsity and JV)
 Choir (Concert and Chamber)
 DECA
 Model UN
 Ski Club
Red Truck Club
Spikeball Club
 Riverdale Club
 Powderpuff 
 Star Trek Club
 Math Girls Rock (a Utah Valley University-sponsored club)
 Breakdance Club

Academics

Distance Learning/Concurrent Enrollment
Provo High School offers 23 distance learning classes through the Utah Valley University (UVU) Live Interactive program.

With the concurrent enrollment program, Provo High School students are able to take a class and receive college credit from Utah Valley University. There are 37 classes available, and, depending on the course, students are required to have a 2.0+ GPA or a 3.0+ as a prerequisite. Students can earn from three to 30 credit hours.

AP
In 2016, 41% of students who took AP exams passed with a score of 3 or more, with a total number of 523 tests taken. In 2015, 51% of students passed AP exams.

PUP
Provo High used to offer a "gifted talent magnet" program for 7th and 8th graders called Provo Unlimited Progress. PUP allowed academically gifted students to attend classes at the high school all day. PUP students are kept in classes together for core subjects except in special cases where students require more rigorous coursework. To get in, 6th graders at any of the nearby middle schools participate in a special testing session (usually in November or December) and parents must submit an online application for the student. They ended this program in the 2017-2018 year.

Notable alumni
 Paul D. Boyer, chemist and 1997 Nobel Laureate
 Kirk Chambers, former professional football player
 Kyle Collinsworth, professional basketball player
 Sean Covey, business executive and author
 Annie D. Danielewski, aka Poe, singer/songwriter
 Mark Z. Danielewski, author
 Brandon Davies, professional basketball player
 Devin Durrant, former professional basketball player, Latter-day Saint auxiliary counselor
 Tracy Hickman, science fiction and fantasy novelist
 Matthew S. Holland, former president of Utah Valley University (2009-2018), LDS general authority
 Michelle Kaufusi, 45th mayor of Provo
 Vance Law, former head coach of the BYU Cougars baseball team
 John Lewis (Arizona politician), mayor of Gilbert, Arizona (2009-2016)
 Gifford Nielsen, former professional football player, LDS general authority
 Dallin H. Oaks, member of the First Presidency of the Church of Jesus Christ of Latter-day Saints
 Ryan Smith, cofounder and chairman of Qualtrics, owner of the Utah Jazz
 Brett Vroman, former professional basketball player
 Mekeli Wesley, former professional basketball player
 Tai Wesley, former professional basketball player
 Kyle Whittingham, head coach of the Utah Utes football team

See also

 List of high schools in Utah

References

External links

 

Public high schools in Utah
Schools in Utah County, Utah
1912 establishments in Utah
Educational institutions established in 1912
Buildings and structures in Provo, Utah